Lučani is a town and municipality located in the Moravica District of western Serbia. The population of the town is 5,142, while the population of the municipality is 20,897.

Settlements
Aside from the town of Lučani, the municipality includes the following settlements:

 Beli Kamen
 Viča
 Vlasteljice
 Vučkovica
 Goračići
 Gornja Kravarica
 Gornji Dubac
 Grab
 Guberevci
 Guča
 Guča village
 Dljin
 Donja Kravarica
 Donji Dubac
 Dučalovići
 Đerađ
 Živica
 Zeoke
 Kaona
 Kotraža
 Krivača
 Krstac
 Lis
 Lisice
 Lučani village
 Markovica
 Milatovići
 Negrišori
 Puhovo
 Pšanik
 Rogača
 Rtari
 Rti
 Tijanje
 Turica

Demographics

In the town of Lučani there are 5,142 inhabitants, while the average age of the population is 38,3 years (37,8 with men and 38,7 with women). There are 7,298 homes in the municipality and the average number of people living together is 2,86.

Ethnic groups
The municipality is largely inhabited by Serbs (97.9%).

Economy
Lučani is home to the chemical defence company Milan Blagojević - Namenska which employs around 1,300 people (as of 2017). Also, Maxima color manufacturer has its factory in Lučani.

The following table gives a preview of total number of registered people employed in legal entities per their core activity (as of 2018):

Sports
Lučani is home to the professional football club FK Mladost Lučani, which has played continuously in the Serbian SuperLiga, the top division of Serbian football.

Notable people
 Radmila Bakočević (b. 1933), opera singer
 Ratko Dostanić (b. 1959), football coach
 Boban Janković (1963–2006), basketball player
 Željko Tanasković (b. 1967), volleyball player
 Radojica Vasić (b. 1976), football player
 MC Stojan (b. 1983), singer
 Milan Bojović (b. 1987), football player

See also
 Guča trumpet festival

References

External links

 

Populated places in Moravica District
Municipalities and cities of Šumadija and Western Serbia